Lauriela Martins (born 31 March 1998) is an Angolan model and beauty pageant titleholder who was crowned Miss Angola 2017 and represented Angola at the Miss Universe 2017 pageant.

Martins was crowned Miss Angola 2017 on 18 December 2016.  At the Miss Universe 2017 pageant, held in Las Vegas, Nevada in November 2017, Martins failed to reach the Top 16.

References

1998 births
Living people
Miss Angola winners
Angolan beauty pageant winners
Angolan female models
Miss Universe 2017 contestants
People from Cabinda (city)